The 2014 Cronulla-Sutherland Sharks season is the 48th in the club's history.

New Signings
Blake Ayshford from Wests Tigers
Matt Prior from St George Illawarra Dragons
Daniel Holdsworth from Hull F.C.
Eric Grothe from Out of Retirement
Siosaia Vave from Melbourne Storm
Tinirau Arona from Sydney Roosters
Jacob Gagan from Manly Sea Eagles

NRL Ladder

Results

 Round 1 - Cronulla Sharks vs Gold Coast Titans (12 - 18)
  Tries: Tinirau Arona, Wade Graham

 Round 2 - Canterbury Bulldogs vs Cronulla Sharks (42 - 4)
  Tries: Jonathan Wright

 Round 3 - Cronulla Sharks vs St George Illawarra Dragons (12 - 14)
  Tries: John Morris (2)

 Round 4 - Newcastle Knights vs Cronulla Sharks (30 - 0)
  Tries: No tries

 Round 5 - Cronulla Sharks vs New Zealand Warriors (37 - 6)
  Tries: Nathan Stapleton (4), Tinirau Arona, Sam Tagataese, Blake Ayshford

 Round 6 - Manly Sea Eagles vs Cronulla Sharks (24 - 4)
  Tries: Wade Graham

 Round 7 - Cronulla Sharks vs Sydney Roosters (18 - 24)
  Tries: Ricky Leutele, Wade Graham, Sosaia Feki

 Round 8 - Cronulla Sharks vs Penrith Panthers (24 - 20)
  Tries: Todd Carney, Ricky Leutele, Michael Gordon, Jeff Robson

 Round 9 - Parramatta Eels vs Cronulla Sharks (42 - 24)
  Tries: Sosaia Feki, Wade Graham, Isaac De Gois, Michael Gordon

 Round 10 - Cronulla Sharks vs Wests Tigers (20 - 22)
  Tries: Sam Tagataese, Paul Gallen, Michael Gordon

 Round 11 - Cronulla Sharks vs South Sydney Rabbitohs (0 - 18)
  Tries: No tries

 Round 13 - St George Illawarra Dragons vs Cronulla Sharks (0 - 30)
  Tries: No tries

 Round 15 - Cronulla Sharks vs Manly Sea Eagles (0 - 26)
  Tries: No tries

 Round 16 - Brisbane Broncos vs Cronulla Sharks (22 - 24)
  Tries: Jacob Gagan, Paul Gallen, Todd Carney, Sosaia Feki

 Round 17 - Sydney Roosters vs Cronulla Sharks (28 - 30)
  Tries: Jacob Gagan (2), Wade Graham, Sosaia Feki, Jeff Robson

 Round 18 - Cronulla Sharks vs Newcastle Knights (18 - 31)
  Tries: Jeff Robson, Michael Gordon, Sosaia Feki

 Round 19 - Cronulla Sharks vs North Queensland Cowboys (18 - 36)
  Tries: Jonathan Wright, Luke Lewis, Michael Gordon

 Round 20 - Penrith Panthers vs Cronulla Sharks (16 - 18)
  Tries: Jacob Gagan (2), Michael Gordon, Sam Tagataese

 Round 21 - Cronulla Sharks vs Parramatta Eels (12 - 32)
  Tries: Fa'amanu Brown, Jeff Robson

 Round 22 - New Zealand Warriors vs Cronulla Sharks (16 - 12)
  Tries: Tinirau Arona, Sosaia Feki

 Round 23 - Melbourne Storm vs Cronulla Sharks (48 - 6)
  Tries: Valentine Holmes

 Round 24 - Cronulla Sharks vs Canberra Raiders (12-22)
  Tries: Sosaia Feki, Tim Robinson

 Round 25 - North Queensland Cowboys vs Cronulla Sharks (20 - 19)
  Tries: Sosaia Feki (2), Pat Politoni
  Field Goal: Daniel Holdsworth

 Round 26 - Wests Tigers vs Cronulla Sharks (26-10)
  Tries: Valentine Holmes (2)

References

Cronulla-Sutherland Sharks seasons
Cronulla-Sutherland Sharks season